This article lists some of the species recognized as belonging to the human microbiome.

Whole-body distributed 
Acinetobacter calcoaceticus
Burkholderia cepacia
Peptostreptococcus spp
Pseudomonas pseudoalcaligenes

Natural cavities 
Eubacterium spp
Fusobacterium necrophorum
Microbacterium spp

Skin 

Acinetobacter spp
Bacillus spp
Candida albicans
Candida parapsilosis
Corynebacterium parvum
Corynebacterium spp
Cutibacterium acnes
Demodex folliculorum
Enterobacter cloacae
Epidermophyton floccosum
Malassezia ovale
Micrococcus luteus
Micrococcus spp
Mycobacterium spp
Neisseria spp
Peptostreptococcus spp
Propionibacterium spp
Pseudomonas aeruginosa
Sarcina spp
Staphylococcus aureus
Staphylococcus epidermidis
Staphylococcus haemolyticus
Streptococcus viridans
Trichophyton spp

Hair follicles 
Staphylococcus aureus

External ear 
Corynebacterium spp
Staphylococcus aureus
Staphylococcus epidermidis

Mucous membranes 
Chlamydia trachomatis
Hemophilus influenzae
Staphylococcus aureus
Staphylococcus epidermidis

Eye 
Chlamydophila pneumoniae
Haemophilus aegyptius
Haemophilus influenzae
Moraxella spp
Neisseria spp
Staphylococcus aureus
Staphylococcus epidermidis
Streptococcus viridans

Gastrointestinal tract

Respiratory tract

Urogenital tract

Vagina

The vaginal microbiota in pregnancy varies markedly during the entire time of gestation. The species and diversity of the microorganisms may be related to the various levels of hormones during pregnancy.

Placenta

Uterus
The healthy uterine microbiome has been identified and over 278 genera have been sequenced.

Ovarian follicle
The ovarian follicle microbiome has been studied using standard culturing techniques. It has been associated with the outcomes of assisted reproductive technologies and birth outcomes. Positive outcomes are related to the presence of Lactobacilli spp while the presence of Propionibacterium and Actinomyces were related to negative outcomes. The microbiome can vary from one ovary to the other. Studies are ongoing in the further identification of those bacteria present.

Male reproductive tract
The microbiome present in seminal fluid has been evaluated. Using traditional culturing techniques the microbiome differs between men who have acute prostatitis and those who have chronic prostatitis. Identification of the seminal fluid microbiome has become one of the diagnostic tools used in treating infertility in men that do not display symptoms of infection or disease. The taxa Pseudomonas, Lactobacillus, and Prevotella display a negative effect on the quality of sperm. The presence of Lactobacillus spp in semen samples is associated with a very high normal sperm count.

References 

Bacteria and humans